= Debra R. Schoenberg =

American attorney

Debra R. Schoenberg is an American attorney specializing in family law and the founder and principal of Schoenberg Family Law Group, P.C., a San Francisco-based law firm. She has practiced law for more than three decades, focusing on divorce, marital property disputes, child custody, spousal support, and other family law matters.

== Early life and education ==
Schoenberg studied philosophy at Western College, a former women's college affiliated with Miami University in Oxford, Ohio. She subsequently attended the University of New Hampshire School of Law (formerly Franklin Pierce Law Center), where she earned her Juris Doctor degree.

== Career ==
Schoenberg began practicing law in New York after being admitted to the New York Bar in 1987. She subsequently practiced in Vermont, where she operated a family law practice in Burlington for approximately 20 years. She served as chair of the Vermont Bar Association's Family Law Section.

In 2009, Schoenberg established Schoenberg Family Law Group, P.C., in San Francisco, California. The firm specializes in family law, including divorce, child custody, marital property division, spousal support, and prenuptial and postnuptial agreements.

Her practice has included complex financial disputes involving substantial marital estates, contested custody proceedings, and matters involving business valuations and property division.

Schoenberg is a frequent lecturer on family law topics and has presented continuing legal education programs on divorce proceedings, financial settlements, child custody, taxation, and related legal issues.

== Professional recognition ==
Schoenberg has received several professional distinctions during her legal career. She is a Fellow of the American Academy of Matrimonial Lawyers and a Certified Family Law Specialist through the State Bar of California Board of Legal Specialization. She is also a Board-Certified Family Law Trial Specialist through the National Board of Trial Advocacy.

She has been selected for the Super Lawyers list on multiple occasions, beginning in 2007. In 2022, she was included in the National Law Journal's Family/Elder Law Trailblazers list.

The Daily Journal has recognized her among its Top Family Law Lawyers in California.

== Community involvement ==
Schoenberg has participated in several community and nonprofit organizations in the San Francisco Bay Area. Her affiliations have included Lava Mae, Camp Newman, Jewish Children and Family Services, the New Israel Fund, and Berkeley Repertory Theatre.
